Cândido Firmino de Mello-Leitão (July 17, 1886 – December 14, 1948) was a Brazilian zoologist who is considered the founder of Arachnology in South America, publishing 198 papers on the taxonomy of Arachnida. He was also involved with education, writing high-school textbooks, and contributed to biogeography, with essays on the distribution of Arachnida in the South American continent.

Biography 

Cândido Firmino de Mello-Leitão was born on the Cajazeiras Farm, Campina Grande, Paraíba state, Brazil, to Colonel Cândido Firmino and Jacunda de Mello-Leitão. He died in Rio de Janeiro, Brazil. His parents were  subsistence farmers, and he had 15 brothers and sisters. He lived most of his childhood at the state of Pernambuco. His first job as a zoologist (1913) was at the Escola Superior de Agricultura e Medicina Veterinária in Piraí, RJ, as a teacher of general Zoology and Systematics. In 1915, he published his first taxonomical paper, with descriptions of some genera and species of spiders from Brazil. He also produced much taxonomic information on the Opiliones, Solifugae, Amblypygi, Uropygi, and smaller orders of arachnids. Mello-Leitão was appointed professor of Zoology at the Museu Nacional, Rio de Janeiro in April 1931, where he remained until December 1937.

Among the many species of spiders researched and catalogued by the zoologist there is one in particular which is very intriguing, given its big size, beauty and carnivore habits (it is a bird eater) – the Lasiodora parahybana. The species was discovered and first described in 1917 in the vicinities of the city of Campina Grande, Paraíba, from where it is endemic.

Mello-Leitão received many honor awards and was appointed or elected to distinguished positions during his career. He was president of the Brazilian Academy of Sciences from 1943 to 1945.

On June 6, 1949, his friend Augusto Ruschi inaugurated the Museum of Biology Mello-Leitão in Santa Teresa, Espírito Santo (state).

The "Mello-Leitão Award" is granted by the Brazilian Academy of Sciences.

Contributions to the taxonomy of Arachnida

Below a list of species of spiders discovered, studied and named by the zoologist, as well as the date of discovered and the country where it they are found:

 Avicularia ancylochira, 1923 — Brazil
 Avicularia bicegoi, 1923 — Brazil
 Avicularia cuminami, 1930 — Brazil
 Avicularia juruensis, 1923 — Brazil
 Avicularia nigrotaeniata, 1940 — Guyana
 Avicularia palmicola, 1945 — Brazil
 Avicularia pulchra, 1933 — Brazil
 Avicularia taunayi, 1920 — Brazil
 Iridopelma zorodes, 1926 — Brazil
 Catumiri argentinense, 1941 — Chile, Argentina
 Hemiercus proximus, 1923 — Brazil
 Tapinauchenius violaceus, 1930 — French Guiana, Brazil
 Acanthoscurria chiracantha, 1923 — Brazil
 Acanthoscurria cunhae, 1923 — Brazil
 Acanthoscurria gomesiana, 1923 — Brazil
 Acanthoscurria juruenicola, 1923 — Brazil
 Acanthoscurria melanotheria, 1923 — Brazil
 Acanthoscurria parahybana, 1926 — Brazil
 Acanthoscurria paulensis, 1923 — Brazil
 Acanthoscurria rhodothele, 1923 — Brazil
 Acanthoscurria rondoniae, 1923 — Brazil
 Acanthoscurria violacea, 1923 — Brazil
 Cesonia irvingi, 1944 — Bahamas, United States
 Ctenus vespertilio, 1941 — Colombia
 Cyclosternum garbei, 1923 — Brazil
 Cyriocosmus fasciatus, 1930 — Brazil
 Cyrtopholis zorodes, 1923 — Brazil
 Eupalaestrus spinosissimus, 1923 — Brazil
 Grammostola inermis, 1941 — Argentina
 Grammostola porteri, 1936 — Chile
 Grammostola pulchra, 1921 — Brazil
 Hapalopus nigriventris, 1939 — Venezuela
 Hapalopus nondescriptus, 1926 — Brazil
 Hapalotremus cyclothorax, 1923 — Brazil
 Hapalotremus exilis, 1923 — Brazil
 Hapalotremus muticus, 1923 — Brazil
 Hapalotremus scintillans, 1929 — Brazil
 Homoeomma hirsutum, 1935 — Brazil
 Homoeomma montanum, 1923 — Brazil
 Homoeomma uruguayense, 1946 — Uruguay, Argentina
 Lasiodora acanthognatha, 1921 — Brazil
 Lasiodora citharacantha, 1921 — Brazil
 Lasiodora cristata, 1923 — Brazil
 Lasiodora cryptostigma, 1921 — Brazil
 Lasiodora difficilis, 1921 — Brazil
 Lasiodora dolichosterna, 1921 — Brazil
 Lasiodora dulcicola, 1921 — Brazil
 Lasiodora erythrocythara, 1921 — Brazil
 Lasiodora fracta, 1921 — Brazil
 Lasiodora itabunae, 1921 — Brazil
 Lasiodora lakoi, 1943 — Brazil
 Lasiodora mariannae, 1921 — Brazil
 Lasiodora parahybana, 1917 — Brazil
 Lasiodora pleoplectra, 1921 — Brazil
 Lasiodora sternalis, 1923 — Brazil
 Lasiodora subcanens, 1921 — Brazil
 Phormictopus australis, 1941 — Argentina
 Phormictopus ribeiroi, 1923 — Brazil
 Plesiopelma insulare, 1923 — Brazil
 Plesiopelma minense, 1943 — Brazil
 Plesiopelma physopus, 1926 — Brazil
 Plesiopelma rectimanum, 1923 — Brazil
 Proshapalopus anomalus, 1923 — Brazil
 Proshapalopus multicuspidatus, 1929 — Brazil
 Sericopelma fallax, 1923 — Brazil
 Vitalius dubius, 1923 — Brazil
 Vitalius roseus, 1923 — Brazil
 Vitalius sorocabae, 1923 — Brazil
 Vitalius vellutinus, 1923 — Brazil
 Vitalius wacketi, 1923 — Brazil

List of arachnological works 

Kury, A.B. & Baptista, Renner L.C., 2004. Arachnological papers published by Cândido Firmino de Mello-Leitão (Arachnida). Publicações Avulsas do Museu Nacional, Rio de Janeiro, 105: 1-17. [Date of publ: October 2004]. PDF

References 

 Cândido de Mello-Leitão (1886-1948). pp 59–63. In: Nomura, Hitoshi. 1991. Vultos da Zoologia Brasileira. Volume I. Coleção Mossoroense série "C", 661, pp. 1–121.

1886 births
1948 deaths
20th-century Brazilian zoologists
Brazilian arachnologists
Members of the Brazilian Academy of Sciences